Alfred Morris is the name of:

 Alfred Hennen Morris (1864–1959), American businessman, politician, and racehorse owner/breeder
 Alfred Morris (cricketer) (1876–1961), English cricketer
 Edwin Morris (bishop) (Alfred Edwin Morris, 1894–1971), Bishop of Monmouth and Archbishop of Wales
 Alf Morris (1928–2012), Baron Morris of Manchester, British Labour Co-operative politician and disability campaigner
 Alfred Morris (university administrator) (born 1941), British academic
 Alfred Morris (American football) (born 1988), American football running back

See also
 Alfred Warrington-Morris (1883–1962), British Royal Air Force officer